The following is a List of England international rugby union footballers killed in the World Wars.  The number of caps they gained is in brackets.  Where it is e.g. 9+1, the second number is the number of Lions caps.



First World War
There were 27 players killed in the First World War.
 Harry Alexander; (7) died on 17 October 1915 Aged 35
 Henry Berry; (4) died on 9 May 1915, Aged 32.
 Henry Brougham, died on 18 February 1923 (of war wounds), Aged 34.
 Arthur James Dingle; (3) died on 22 August 1915, Aged 23
 George Eric Burroughs Dobbs, (1) died on 17 June 1917, Aged 32.
 Leonard Haigh, (7) died on 6 August 1916 Aged 29.
 Reginald Harry Myburgh Hands, (2) ("Reggie Hands") died on 20 April 1918, Aged 29 Hands was a South African who played cricket for South Africa and rugby for England.
 Arthur Leyland Harrison VC; (2) died on 23 April 1918, Aged 32
 Harold Augustus Hodges; (2) died on 24 March 1918, Aged 32
 Rupert Edward Inglis; (3) died on 18 September 1916, Aged 53
 Percy Dale Kendall; (3) died on 21 January 1915, Aged 34
 John Abbott King; (12) died on 9 August 1916, Aged 32
 Ronald Lagden; (1) died on 3 March 1915, Aged 26
 Douglas Lambert; (7) died on 13 October 1915, Aged 32
 Alfred Frederick Maynard; (3) died on 13 November 1916, Aged 22
 Edgar Roberts Mobbs, (7) ("Mobbsy") died on 29 July 1917, Aged 37
 William Moore Bell Nanson; (2) died on 4 June 1915, Aged 34
 Francis Eckley Oakeley; (4) died on 25 November 1914, Aged 23
 Robert Pillman; (1) died on 9 July 1916, Aged 23
 Ronald William Poulton-Palmer, (17) ("Ronnie Poulton") died on 5 May 1915, Aged 25
 John Raphael, (9+1) died on 11 June 1917, Aged 35
 Reginald Oscar Schwarz MC, ("Reggie Schwarz") (3) died on 18 November 1918, Aged 43 Schwarz also played cricket for South Africa and rugby union for England.
 Lancelot Slocock; (8) died on 9 August 1916, Aged 29
 Francis Nathaniel Tarr; (4) died on 18 July 1915, Aged 27
 Alexander Todd, (2+4) died on 21 April 1915, Aged 41
 James Henry Digby Watson; (3) died on 15 October 1914, Aged 24.
 Charles Edward Wilson; (1) died on 17 September 1914, Aged 43
 Arthur James Wilson, (1) died on 1 July 1917, Aged 29

Second World War
There were 15 players killed in the Second World War:
 Brian Henry Black (10+5)
 Lewis Alfred Booth (7)
 Paul Cooke (2)
 Vivian Gordon Davies (2)
 H.D. Freakes (3)
 R.A. Gerrard (14)
 W. G. E. Luddington  (13)
 Robert Michall Marshall (5)
 John Selwyn Moll (2 Lions caps)
 Alexander Obolensky (4)
 Ernest Ian Parsons(1)
 Henry Rew (10+4)
 Christopher Champain Tanner (5)
 Derek Edmund Teden (3)
 N.A. Wodehouse (14)

See also
 List of international rugby union players killed in World War I

References

 Starmer-Smith, Nigel (ed) Rugby – A Way of Life, An Illustrated History of Rugby (Lennard Books, 1986 )

External links
 http://www.rugbyfootballhistory.com/rugbyatwar.html

World War
 
 
England
Rugby union footballers killed
England in World War II
Lists of people killed in World War II